The following are lists of Arrowverse episodes:

 List of Arrow episodes
 List of Batwoman episodes
 List of Black Lightning episodes
 List of The Flash episodes
 List of Freedom Fighters: The Ray episodes
 List of Legends of Tomorrow episodes
 List of Supergirl episodes
 List of Vixen episodes

See also
 List of Constantine episodes
 List of The Flash (1990 TV series) episodes
 List of Superman & Lois episodes